"Bodyguard" was the second American single from the Bee Gees' One album. "Bodyguard" was a cassette-only single released in early 1990. In Europe and Asia, the A-side was "Tokyo Nights" instead of "Bodyguard". In Brazil, it was "Wish You Were Here". Lead vocals are provided by Robin Gibb.

Music video
The original video was deemed too sexual and was subsequently toned down. The controversy of the video hurt airplay of the single, though it charted well in the Adult Contemporary market reaching number 9 on Billboard and number 5 on Radio & Records.

References 

Bee Gees songs
1990 singles
Songs written by Barry Gibb
Songs written by Maurice Gibb
Songs written by Robin Gibb
1989 songs
Warner Records singles